Makea Pori Ariki (b – 28 October 1839) was a sovereign of the Cook Islands. He was the ariki (king or high chief) of the Makea Nui (Great Makea) dynasty, one of the three chiefdoms of the Te Au O Tonga tribe on the island of Rarotonga.

He succeeded his father Makea Tinirau Ariki after his death in 1823. In the same year, the English missionary John Williams arrived at Rarotonga, intending to convert the population to Christianity. After agreeing to destroy their temple and the pagan idols of his tribe, Makea Pori Ariki was baptized in 1825.

He died on 28 October 1839 and was succeeded by his eldest son Makea Davida.

See also
History of the Cook Islands
House of Ariki

References

External links

Rarotongan Genealogy - Genealogy of the Kings of Rarotonga
Kings of Rarotonga, as given by the "Wise Men" of Makea & Tinomana in 1869
Land Tenure in the Cook Islands: Relations between the tribes
The Royal Family Lineage: Makea Karika Ariki Te-au-o-tonga
 

Year of birth uncertain
People from Rarotonga
Rarotongan monarchs
Royalty of the Cook Islands
1839 deaths
19th-century monarchs in Oceania
Converts to Christianity from pagan religions